The Russian Orthodox Church in Uzbekistan is the main community of Eastern Orthodox Christianity in Uzbekistan, a mainly Muslim country. Many of its members are Russians. Uzbekistan falls within the area of Tashkent and Central Asian Eparchy of the Russian Orthodox Church. The Eparchy is headed by a Metropolitan. Since 2011, the current Metropolitan of Tashkent and Central Asia is Vincent (Morar).

Russian Orthodox Church in Uzbekistan has been established in 1871 and extends to Tajikistan, Turkmenistan and Kyrgyzstan. The Russian Orthodox Church has a better standing with the government than other religious groups do. The Uzbek government adheres to a secularist policy.

See also 
Religion in Uzbekistan
Christianity in Uzbekistan
Eastern Orthodoxy in Uzbekistan
Protestantism in Uzbekistan
Roman Catholicism in Uzbekistan

References

External links 
 Official site (in Russian)

Uzbekistan
Eastern Orthodoxy in Uzbekistan
Eastern Orthodox Church bodies in Asia

ru:Русская Православная Церковь в Узбекистане